In homological algebra, a branch of mathematics, a quasi-isomorphism or quism is a morphism A → B of chain complexes (respectively, cochain complexes) such that the induced morphisms

of homology groups (respectively, of cohomology groups) are isomorphisms for all n.

In the theory of model categories, quasi-isomorphisms are sometimes used as the class of weak equivalences when the objects of the category are chain or cochain complexes. This results in a homology-local theory, in the sense of Bousfield localization in homotopy theory.

See also
 Derived category

References
Gelfand, Sergei I., Manin, Yuri I. Methods of Homological Algebra, 2nd ed. Springer, 2000.

Algebraic topology
Homological algebra
Equivalence (mathematics)